Divergent is a series of young adult science fiction adventure novels by American novelist Veronica Roth set in a post-apocalyptic dystopian Chicago. The trilogy consists of Divergent (2011), Insurgent (2012) and Allegiant (2013). A related book, Four (2014), presents a series of short stories told from the perspective of one of the trilogy's characters, the male love interest Tobias. A later short story, We Can Be Mended (2018), serves as an epilogue five years after the events of the trilogy, again from Tobias's perspective.

The trilogy is set in the future in a dystopian society that is divided into five factions. The trilogy's society defines its members by their social and personality affiliations, with the five different factions removing the threat of anyone exercising independent will and threatening the population's safety. Beatrice Prior, who later changes her name to Tris, is born into Abnegation but transfers into Dauntless; she must figure out her life as a Divergent, conceal her true nature, and live with the danger of being killed if her true nature is discovered by the Erudite and Dauntless leaders.

List of books

Divergent

The first main installment in the series tells the story of Beatrice Prior, a teenager who lives in a post-apocalyptic Chicago in which society has been divided into five factions, each with a specialized social function: Abnegation, Amity, Candor, Dauntless, and Erudite. Beatrice, a member of Abnegation, transfers to Dauntless at the age of 16, takes the new name Tris in the process, and forms a romantic relationship with a fellow Abnegation transfer, Tobias Eaton. As she eases herself into her new home, Tris slowly uncovers a conspiracy that threatens to tear the balance of the faction system.

Insurgent

The second main installment in the series is set immediately after the events of Divergent.

Tris, Tobias, and their allies begin rallying the favor of other factions and the Factionless, those who do not fit with the faction system, against the tyranny of the Erudite leader Jeanine Matthews, in order to save the Divergent.

Allegiant

The third and final main installment in the series takes place after the ending of Insurgent. Tris, Tobias, and their allies escape from a Chicago that is now dominated by the Factionless towards the fringes. They learn the real nature of Chicago's faction system and must then find a way to prevent a civil war from wreaking havoc on their hometown.

Four: A Divergent Collection

The anthology consists of five short stories previously released separately as e-books, in addition to three new ones. The book focuses on Tobias Eaton and is both a prequel and a retelling of certain events of the first book, Divergent.

We Can Be Mended:  A Divergent Series Epilogue
The short story serves as an epilogue to the series. Taking place three years after the events of Allegiant, it focuses on Tobias and Christina as they slowly form a romantic relationship as a way to fill the void left behind by their dead lovers: Tris and Will.

Critical reception
The trilogy received positive reviews from critics. Critics praised Divergent for its plot and action, and Insurgent was praised for its writing and pace.
Another critic said, "No one can argue that Divergent is not a fun, edge-of-your-seat read. It is easy to get submerged in, effortless to remain engaged in, and impossible not to enjoy even the slightest bit." Allegiant was praised for being "gripping" and for the love story, but was criticized for its ending and prose.

Film adaptations

Summit Entertainment had bought the rights to film an adaptation of the novel and recruited Neil Burger to direct, with Shailene Woodley starring as Beatrice "Tris" Prior and Theo James as Tobias "Four" Eaton. Lionsgate and its subsidiary Summit Entertainment distributed the film. Kate Winslet was signed as Jeanine Matthews. Also recruited into the cast were Maggie Q as Tori, Zoe Kravitz as Christina, Ansel Elgort as Caleb, Miles Teller as Peter, Ashley Judd as Natalie Prior, Tony Goldwyn as Andrew Prior, and Jai Courtney as Eric. Divergent was released on March 21, 2014. Insurgent began filming in Atlanta on May 27, 2014 and was released on March 20, 2015. The adaptation of Allegiant was split into two parts; the first part, Allegiant, was released on March 18, 2016, while the second part, titled Ascendant, was originally planned to be released in June 2017. The big screen release of Ascendant was shelved due to the poor box office results of Allegiant. On July 20, 2016, it was announced that Ascendant would be released as a TV movie, but later scrapped.

References

See also
 The Giver

 
Book series introduced in 2011
Science fiction novel trilogies
Dystopian novels
American adventure novels
Young adult novel series
Literary trilogies
Post-apocalyptic novels
Fiction about mind control
Katherine Tegen Books books